Sergey Golyaev (born November 3, 1981) is a Russian mixed martial artist.

Background
Sergey Golyaev has a Muay Thai and Karate background. He started to be engaged in karate at 14 years old and his Muay Thai experience dates back 9 years.

Mixed martial arts career
Sergey Golyaev pulled the upset win against the No.1 lightweight Takanori Gomi in World Victory Road Presents: Sengoku 6 back in November 2008.
This was considered a huge upset win and Gomi was no longer considered to be the greatest lightweight and dropped from the Top 10 rankings.

Accomplishments

Mixed martial arts
Sherdog Upset of the Year: 2008 - Sergey Golyaev vs. Takanori Gomi

Muay Thai 
Saint Petersburg open Muay Thai champion.
Two time Russian lightweight Muay Thai champion.
Russian North-West regions Muay Thai champion.

Mixed martial arts record

|-
| Loss
| align=center| 23-11
| Ivan Buchinger
| Submission (rear-naked choke)
| M-1 Challenge 47
| 
| align=center| 1
| align=center| N/A
| Orenburg, Russia
|
|-
| Win
| align=center| 23-10
| Dzhumabek Aktilek
| TKO (punches)
| SVS MMA-Commonwealth Cup 2012
| 
| align=center| 2
| align=center| 1:55
|
|
|-
| Win
| align=center| 22-10
| Kuat Khamitov
| Submission (Arm-Triangle Choke)
| Bushido Lithuania: vol. 51
| 
| align=center| 2
| align=center| 0:36
| 
| 
|-
| Win
| align=center| 21-10
| Ott Tonissaar
| Submission (Armbar)
| Lion's Fights 1: The Beginning
| 
| align=center| 1
| align=center| 1:37
| 
| 
|-
| Win
| align=center| 20-10
| Djamshed Mavlonov
| TKO (Doctor Stoppage)
| League of Combat Sambo: Cup of Ismail Somani
| 
| align=center| 1
| align=center| 1:02
| 
| 
|-
| Win
| align=center| 19-10
| Ramon Diaz
| KO (Punch)
| League S-70: Sambo 70 vs. Spain
| 
| align=center| 2
| align=center| 3:40
| 
| 
|-
| Win
| align=center| 18-10
| Eduard Pestrak
| Submission (Achilles Lock)
| NOFC 1: New Order Fighting Championship
| 
| align=center| 1
| align=center| 2:21
| 
| 
|-
| Loss
| align=center| 17-10
|Ali Bagov
| Submission (Rear-Naked Choke)
| ProFC: Union Nation Cup 11
| 
| align=center| 1
| align=center| 4:54
| 
| 
|-
| Loss
| align=center| 17-9
| Ruslan Kelekhsaev
| Decision (Unanimous)
| Draka: Governor's Cup 2010
| 
| align=center| 2
| align=center| 5:00
| 
| 
|-
| Loss
| align=center| 17-8
| John Alessio
| Submission (Kimura)
| United Glory 12
| 
| align=center| 2
| align=center| 01:51
| 
| Welterweight Tournament quarterfinal bout
|-
| Win
| align=center| 17-7
| Ivan Buchinger
| KO (Punch)
| APF: Azerbaijan vs. Europe
| 
| align=center| 1
| align=center| 00:20
| 
| 
|-
| Win
| align=center| 16-7
| Artiom Damkovsky
| Decision (Split)
| Bushido FC: Legends
| 
| align=center| 3
| align=center| 05:00
| 
| 
|-
| Win
| align=center| 15-7
| Danny van Bergen
| TKO (Punches)
| Bushido FC: Legends
| 
| align=center| 1
| align=center| 04:57
| 
| 
|-
| Win
| align=center| 14-7
| Shamil Zagirov
| Submission (Armbar)
| ProFC: Union Nation Cup 2
| 
| align=center| 1
| align=center| 02:30
| 
| 
|-
| Loss
| align=center| 13-7
| Eiji Mitsuoka
| Submission (Armbar)
| World Victory Road Presents: Sengoku no Ran 2009
| 
| align=center| 1
| align=center| 04:22
| 
| 
|-
| Win
| align=center| 13-6
| Takanori Gomi
| Decision (Split)
| World Victory Road Presents: Sengoku 6
| 
| align=center| 3
| align=center| 05:00
| 
| Sherdog 2008 Upset of the Year
|-
| Win
| align=center| 12-6
| Aleksandr Dalishniy
| TKO (Punches)
| Shooto Russia: Against The War
| 
| align=center| 2
| align=center| 02:20
| 
| 
|-
| Win
| align=center| 11-6
| Vladimir Soroka
| Decision
| FOP: Fire of Persevit
| 
| align=center| N/A
| align=center| N/A
| 
| 
|-
| Win
| align=center| 10-6
| Thomas Hytten
| Decision (Unanimous)
| Zst: Prestige
| 
| align=center| 3
| align=center| 05:00
| 
| 
|-
| Win
| align=center| 9-6
| Rustam Kuraev
| Submission (Armbar)
| M-1 MFC: New Blood
| 
| align=center| 1
| align=center| 02:40
| 
| 
|-
| Loss
| align=center| 8-6
| Kurt Pellegrino
| Submission (Arm-Triangle Choke)
| Euphoria: USA vs. Russia
| 
| align=center| 1
| align=center| 03:24
| 
| 
|-
| Loss
| align=center| 8-5
| Furdjel de Windt
| Submission (Rear Naked Choke)
| JE: Holland vs Russia
| 
| align=center| 3
| align=center| N/A
| 
| 
|-
| Win
| align=center| 8-4
| Pavel Lesko
| Submission (Armbar)
| M-1 MFC: International Fight Night
| 
| align=center| 1
| align=center| 02:15
| 
| 
|-
| Win
| align=center| 7-4
| Said Khalilov
| Submission (Triangle Choke)
| M-1 MFC: Heavyweight GP
| 
| align=center| 1
| align=center| 01:14
| 
| 
|-
| Loss
| align=center| 6-4
| Joachim Hansen
| Submission (Rear Naked Choke)
| Euphoria: Road to the Titles
| 
| align=center| 1
| align=center| 03:24
| 
| 
|-
| Win
| align=center| 6-3
| Dmitriy Megrobyan
| Submission (Triangle Choke)
| M-1 MFC: Mix-Fight
| 
| align=center| N/A
| align=center| N/A
| 
| 
|-
| Loss
| align=center| 5-3
| Rich Clementi
| Submission (Triangle Choke)
| Euphoria: Russia vs USA
| 
| align=center| 2
| align=center| 03:43
| 
| 
|-
| Loss
| align=center| 5-2
| Yuri Ivlev
| Submission (Armbar)
| M-1 MFC: Russia vs. the World 6
| 
| align=center| 1
| align=center| 02:35
| 
| 
|-
| Win
| align=center| 5-1
| Sergei Pashenko
| Decision (Unanimous)
| M-1 MFC: Russia vs. Ukraine
| 
| align=center| 2
| align=center| 05:00
| 
| 
|-
| Win
| align=center| 4-1
| Magomed Khimelov
| Submission (Armlock)
| M-1 MFC: Russia vs. the World 5
| 
| align=center| 1
| align=center| 01:43
| 
| 
|-
| Win
| align=center| 3-1
| Sergei Betsky
| Submission (Armbar)
| M-1 MFC: Russia vs. the World 5
| 
| align=center| 1
| align=center| 01:43
| 
| 
|-
| Loss
| align=center| 2-1
| Colin Mannsur
| Decision (1-0 Points)
| FFH: Free Fight Explosion 2
| 
| align=center| 2
| align=center| 05:00
| 
| 
|-
| Win
| align=center| 2-0
| Rasim Kasumov
| Submission (Triangle Choke)
| M-1 MFC: Exclusive Fight Night 3
| 
| align=center| 1
| align=center| 02:45
| 
| 
|-
| Win
| align=center| 1-0
| Matvey Pereshivailo
| Submission (Armbar)
| M-1 MFC: Exclusive Fight Night 2
| 
| align=center| 1
| align=center| 02:10
| 
|

References

Living people
1981 births
Russian male mixed martial artists
Lightweight mixed martial artists
Welterweight mixed martial artists
Mixed martial artists utilizing Muay Thai
Mixed martial artists utilizing karate
Russian male kickboxers
Russian Muay Thai practitioners
Russian male karateka